Roy E. Lee Field at Simmons Baseball Complex is a baseball venue in Edwardsville, Illinois, United States.  It is home to the SIU Edwardsville Cougars baseball team of the NCAA Division I Ohio Valley Conference. 

The facility, which has a capacity of 1,500 spectators, is named for SIUE's first baseball coach, Roy E. Lee. The distance to the fences is 330 feet to right and left fields and 390 to center.

In the offseason following the 2010 season, the locker rooms and dugouts were renovated.  Additionally, the field features an AstroTurf GameDay Grass playing field, an electronic scoreboard, and a stand of pine trees in center field that acts as a batter's eye.  The seating structure lies behind home plate and includes a covered grandstand of bleacher-style seating along with three rows of chairback seating closest to the field.

In the summer of 2014, additional improvements were made with funding approved by the  SIU Board of Trustees in February.  The outfield grass was replaced with the same AstroTurf GameDay Grass as has been on the infield since 2011 to allow year-round practice and play. The outfield wall was also replaced, creating a symmetrical field.

See also 
 List of NCAA Division I baseball venues

References 

College baseball venues in the United States
Baseball venues in Illinois
SIU Edwardsville Cougars baseball
Edwardsville, Illinois
Sports venues completed in 1972
1972 establishments in Illinois
Buildings and structures in Madison County, Illinois